As of 2020, China had the world's second-highest number of top universities in several most cited international rankings including the Academic Ranking of World Universities (ARWU), the QS World University Rankings and U.S. News & World Report Best Global University Ranking. The Double First-Class Universities are considered to be the most elite institutions of Chinese tertiary education, representing the top 5% of overall universities and colleges in Mainland China (approximately 3,000 higher education institutions).

Regardless of universities in China being involved in a variety of university rankings, the Ministry of Education of China does not advocate or recognize any ranking published by other institutions.

Rankings distribution

Global 
China had the world's second-highest number of top universities in the Academic Ranking of World Universities (ARWU), the US News and World Report Best Global University Ranking, the Center for World University Rankings (CWUR), the Performance Ranking of Scientific Papers for World Universities and the Three University Missions Ranking. 

In the 2021 CWTS Leiden Ranking, China has the largest number of universities including in the ranking with 221 out of 1,225 universities from 69 countries. The University Ranking by Academic Performance 2020-2021 shortlisted 3,000 research universities from 123 countries in the ranking: China tops the list, with 485 universities. China is also the most-represented nation overall in the SCImago Institutions Rankings list with 549 universities. More than 2,500 universities in China are ranked in the Webometrics Ranking of World Universities out of almost 31,000 institutions, including in the ranking worldwide.

There were 26 universities from Mainland China on lists of the global top 200 in the 2022 Shanghai Ranking's ARWU, behind only the United States in terms of the overall representation.

Regional 
China has dominated the QS BRICS University Rankings and the THE's Emerging Economies University Rankings since its inception, claiming 7 of the top 10 spots for both rankings. China is also the most-represented nation overall. In 2020, China tops the QS Asia University Rankings list with over 120 universities including in the ranking, and five Chinese universities appear in the Asia Top 10, which is more than any other country. As of 2022, there were seven universities from Mainland China on lists of the global top 100 in the Shanghai Ranking's ARWU and the Times Higher Education Rankings, the highest in Asia in terms of overall representation.

Major International Rankings

Bibliometric-based rankings 
Annual international rankings of the bibliometric-based rankings include the Academic Ranking of World Universities, the Performance Ranking of Scientific Papers for World Universities, the University Ranking by Academic Performance, the CWTS Leiden Ranking, the SCImago Institutions Rankings, the Center for World University Rankings (CWUR), and the Nature Index Annual Tables published by Nature Research.

Shanghai Ranking's Academic Ranking of World Universities (ARWU)

University Ranking By Academic Performance (URAP) 
A complete ranking of 485 Chinese universities, including in the top 3,000 universities worldwide, can be found through the external link according to the University Ranking by Academic Performance 2020-2021.

WURI Global Top 100 Innovative Universities Rankings

CSRankings: Computer Science Rankings

AIRankings: AI Institute and Author Rankings by Publications

Opinion-based rankings 
A number of international publications formulate their rankings using the weighted average of opinions gathered in surveys, including the QS World University Rankings, the Times Higher Education World University Rankings and the U.S. News and World Report Best Global University Ranking.

QS World University Rankings

Times Higher Education World University Rankings

Times Higher Education Most International Universities Ranking

US News Best Global Universities Ranking

Other Global Rankings 
Other international rankings:

 CWTS Leiden Ranking by CWTS Leiden Ranking
 Nature Index by Nature Research
 UTN Rankings by Performance Ranking of Scientific Papers for World Universities
 SCImago Institutions Rankings by SCImago Institutions Rankings
 The Center for World University Rankings  by the Center for World University Rankings (CWUR)
 Webometrics Ranking ranks more than 2500 universities in China by the Webometrics Ranking of World Universities

References

Universities
University and college rankings
Universities in China
China